The Hinckley 43 (Hood) is an American sailboat that was designed by Ted Hood and first built in 1979.

The design was originally marketed by the manufacturer as the Hinckley 43, but is now usually referred to as the Hinckley 43 (Hood)-2 to differentiate it from the earlier 1976 Hinckley 43 (Hood) and the unrelated 1990 Hinckley 43 (McCurdy & Rhodes) design.

Production
The design was built by Hinckley Yachts in the United States, from 1979, but it is now out of production.

Design
The Hinckley 43 (Hood) is a recreational keelboat, built predominantly of fiberglass, with wood trim. It has a masthead sloop rig and a fixed fin keel with a retractable centerboard. It displaces .

The boat is fitted with an inboard engine for docking and maneuvering.

See also
List of sailing boat types

References

Keelboats
1970s sailboat type designs
Sailing yachts
Sailboat type designs by Ted Hood
Sailboat types built by Hinckley Yachts